The Muntinlupa Sunken Garden, also known as the New Bilibid Prison Sunken Garden and often shortened to simply Sunken Garden, is a large public urban park and a local government-protected zone in Muntinlupa, southern Metro Manila, the Philippines. It is an open grassy space on the southern shore of Jamboree Lake that is lower than the surrounding elevation in the New Bilibid Prison Reservation. The park is under the joint operation and management of the City Government of Muntinlupa and the Bureau of Corrections.

Description

The Muntinlupa Sunken Garden is in the central area of the Poblacion village at the eastern section of the  prison reservation. It is an open grassland delineated by large canopy trees that serves as a buffer between New Bilibid Prison and the communities in east Poblacion. The roughly  park borders Jamboree Lake to the north with the main prison facility and maximum security compound located at its southern end. It is bounded by General Paulino Santos Avenue to the south and west, with the main road leading in and out of the prison reservation known as Insular Prison Road running along the park's northern boundary.

Within the park's bounds is the Memorial Hill, a historical landmark that stands at the northern side near Jamboree Lake. It contains a Marian grotto with a statue of Our Lady of Lourdes. Also in the vicinity is a Japanese vintage cannon used during World War II as well as a memorial to Major Eriberto Misa, the longest serving director of the New Bilibid Prison. Across the park's central section on Insular Prison Road is the Our Lady of Mercy chapel also known as Ina ng Awa Parish Church that replaced the grotto at Memorial Hill where regular masses were held in the early 1950s. The park also hosts a recreation camp with gazeboes near the lake and extends into the western side of Insular Prison Road north of the chapel as the smaller New Bilibid Prisons Park.

A portion of the Sunken Garden was formerly used as a food production area for the prison inmates and employees in the 1940s. In 2007, a portion of the Sunken Garden was declared a mini-forest park through Resolution No. 07-382 signed by Mayor Jaime R. Fresnedi.

Recreation
The Muntinlupa Sunken Garden is a popular recreational area for people living in the locality. In addition to serving as the main venue for events and ceremonies sponsored by the Bureau of Corrections, it hosts a number of outdoor activities for locals and visitors, including fitness classes, fun runs, football and fishing. The MJRF Fishing Competition initiated by Mayor Fresnedi in 2013 is an annual competition that takes place in Jamboree Lake. Students from the nearby Itaas Elementary School also use the open spaces at the Sunken Garden for their yearly "Field Day" and regular open-air athletics.

In 2014, a resolution was approved allocating a portion of the Sunken Garden for the construction of modern football field. Since May 2015, the park also hosts free weekly outdoor cinema screenings by the lake sponsored by the Muntinlupa local government.

Gallery

See also
 List of parks in Metro Manila

References

Parks in Metro Manila